Black Sessions are performances of live music broadcast on the French radio station France Inter. They are recorded in front of a live audience and feature on the C'est Lenoir show. The name is a pun based on the name of their creator, Bernard Lenoir, translated literally as "Bernard the black"

The first performance was in 1992 and since then many French and international artists have performed Black sessions including:

Andrew Bird
Arctic Monkeys
Band of Horses
Beirut
Belle & Sebastian
Belly
Bloc Party
Bonnie 'Prince' Billy
The Boo Radleys
Broadcast
Calexico (Session no. 163; recorded live at studio 105 May 22, 2000)
The Cardigans
Catatonia
Chumbawamba (21 October 1994)
Clap Your Hands Say Yeah
CocoRosie
Cocteau Twins
The Cure
Death in Vegas (21 October 1999)
The Divine Comedy
Drugstore
Echobelly  (21 October 1994)
Editors
The Eels
Elbow
Emilie Simon
Field Music
Feist
Franz Ferdinand (recorded 2005)
Gemma Hayes
Goldfrapp
Grandaddy
Guillemots
Gumball (May 26, 1993)
The House of Love (Session no.6; recorded May 6, 1992)
Interpol (Interpol released The Black EP which featured a number of tracks from their 2002 Black Session)
Klaxons
Lloyd Cole (1993 [covered Bob Dylan's "It's All Over Now, Baby Blue"], 1995)
Los Campesinos!
Lush (*01147 - Session no. 55; recorded live at studio 105 June 28, 1994 Paris, France)
Madrugada (Session no. 159; recorded live at studio 105 April 3, 2000)
Mazzy Star (1993-10-25)
Mojave 3 (in their first public performance)
Morphine
The National
Nick Cave
Nine Black Alps (the Glitter Gulch EP released by Nine Black Alps contains "Coldhearted", the song performed on their Black Session)
Paul Weller (October 16, 1992)
Pavement
Placebo (band)
The Posies (1 March 1994)
Pulp
Radiohead
The Raveonettes
Ride
The Rentals
Röyksopp (with a power-out goof at the beginning)
Sleeper (8 March 1994 - bassist Diid Osman fell over onstage, as recounted in singer Louise Wener's memoir Different For Girls)
Rufus Wainwright
The Shins
The Smashing Pumpkins
Smoke City
Sparklehorse (Session no. 250 ; recorded September 25, 2006)
Suede (recorded October 4, 1996)
The Sundays
Throwing Muses
These New Puritans
The Verve
The Wedding Present
Weezer
Wire - released as the album The Black Session: Paris, 10 May 2011
The Wombats
Yann Tiersen (2 December 1998, and released as Black Session: Yann Tiersen by Ici, d'ailleurs... on 2 November 1999)

References

External links
List of bands who have performed Black Sessions
C'est Lenoir Official Homepage (in French)
Black Sessions photos (1998 - 2000) by Laurent Orseau
The Black Sessions: la musique pas comme les autres - list of Black Sessions

French public radio programs
Radio France
1992 radio programme debuts
Rock music radio programs